Two ships and a training establishment of the Royal Navy have borne the name HMS Vernon, possibly after Admiral Edward Vernon:

  was a 14-gun armed ship listed between 1781 and 1782.
  was a 50-gun fourth rate launched in 1832.  She became tender to the Navy's gunnery school , and then the torpedo school ship in 1876.  She was renamed HMS Actaeon in 1886 and sold in 1923.
  was the torpedo school established in 1876.  She remained in commission until 1996, using a number of different hulked ships as her home until she moved ashore in 1923.  Ships that have been named Vernon whilst part of the school include:
  was jointly commissioned as Vernon with the original Vernon in 1876 and was used until 1886.
  was Vernon from 1886.
  was Vernon II from 1895.
  was Vernon III from 1904.
 HMS Actaeon (the original HMS Vernon (1832)) was renamed Vernon IV in 1904.
  a minelaying tender, was renamed Vernon in 1938.

References
 

Royal Navy ship names